The Companies Act 1965, is a Malaysian law which relates to companies.

Structure
The Companies Act 1965, in its current form (15 August 2007), consists of 12 Parts containing 374 sections and 10 schedules (including 36 amendments).
 Part I: Preliminary
 Part II: Administration of Act
 Part III: Constitution of Companies
 Division 1: Incorporation
 Division 2: Powers
 Part IV: Shares, Debentures and Charges
 Division 1: Prospectuses
 Division 2: Restrictions on Allotment and Commencement of Business
 Division 3: Shares
 Division 3A: Substantial Shareholdings
 Division 4: Debentures
 Division 5: Interests other than Shares, Debentures, etc.
 Division 6: Title and Transfers
 Division 6A: Provisions Applicable to Companies whose Securities are Deposited with the Central Depository
 Division 7: Registration of Charges
 Part V: Management and Administration
 Division 1: Office and Name
 Division 2: Directors and Officers
 Division 3: Meetings and Proceedings
 Division 4: Register of Members
 Division 5: Annual Return
 Part VI: Accounts and Audit
 Division 1: Accounts
 Division 2: Audit
 Part VII: Arrangement and Reconstructions
 Part VIII: Receivers and Managers
 Part IX: Investigations
 Part X: Winding up
 Division 1: Preliminary
 Division 2: Winding up by the Court
 Subdivision 1: General
 Subdivision 2: Liquidators
 Subdivision 3: Committees of Inspection 
 Subdivision 4: General Powers of Court 
 Division 3: Voluntary Winding up
 Subdivision 1: Introductory 
 Subdivision 2: Provisions applicable only to Members' Voluntary Winding up 
 Subdivision 3: Provisions applicable only to Creditors' Voluntary Winding up
 Subdivision 4: Provisions applicable to every Voluntary Winding up 
 Division 4: Provisions Applicable to Every Mode of Winding up
 Subdivision 1: General
 Subdivision 2: Proof and Ranking of Claims
 Subdivision 3: Effect on other Transactions 
 Subdivision 4: Offences 
 Subdivision 5: Dissolution
 Division 5: Winding up of Unregistered Companies
 Part XI: Various Types of Companies, etc.
 Division 1: Investment Companies
 Division 2: Foreign Companies
 Part XII: General
 Division 1: Enforcement of Act
 Division 2: Offences
 Division 3: Miscellaneous
 Schedules

See also
Companies Act

References

External links
 Companies Act 1965 

1965 in Malaysian law
Malaysian federal legislation